Lyman is a town in Grafton County, New Hampshire, United States. The population was 585 at the 2020 census.

History 
Lyman, along with Grantham, Lisbon, and eleven Vermont towns, was granted as compensation to General Phineas Lyman, a commander in the French and Indian War. According to the county gazetteer, "It was granted to Daniel Lyman and sixty-three others, November 10, 1761, its name being derived from the fact that eleven of the grantees bore the name of Lyman. The grantees failed to comply with the requirements of their charter, and thus forfeited their grant, but an extension of time was granted them July 20, 1769." Lyman was incorporated in 1761. In 1880 it had a population of 665.

Geography 
The town is drained by tributaries of the Ammonoosuc River and is part of the Connecticut River watershed.

The town's initial grant included land along the Connecticut River. In 1854 the portion of Lyman found west of "Gardner's Mountain" was separately incorporated as Monroe.

Demographics 

As of the census of 2000, there were 487 people, 211 households, and 150 families living in the town.  The population density was 17.1 people per square mile (6.6/km2).  There were 280 housing units at an average density of 9.8 per square mile (3.8/km2).  The racial makeup of the town was 98.36% White, 0.21% African American, 0.21% Native American, 0.21% Asian, 0.41% from other races, and 0.62% from two or more races. Hispanic or Latino of any race were 0.21% of the population.

There were 211 households, out of which 24.6% had children under the age of 18 living with them, 61.1% were married couples living together, 4.7% had a female householder with no husband present, and 28.9% were non-families. 20.9% of all households were made up of individuals, and 4.3% had someone living alone who was 65 years of age or older.  The average household size was 2.31 and the average family size was 2.64.

In the town, the population was spread out, with 19.9% under the age of 18, 4.5% from 18 to 24, 32.0% from 25 to 44, 31.6% from 45 to 64, and 11.9% who were 65 years of age or older.  The median age was 42 years. For every 100 females, there were 102.1 males.  For every 100 females age 18 and over, there were 105.3 males.

The median income for a household in the town was $46,607, and the median income for a family was $48,365. Males had a median income of $27,500 versus $23,375 for females. The per capita income for the town was $22,332.  About 3.5% of families and 6.5% of the population were below the poverty line, including 6.5% of those under age 18 and 6.7% of those age 65 or over.

References

External links 
 
 New Hampshire Economic and Labor Market Information Bureau Profile
 Lisbon Area Historical Society

Towns in Grafton County, New Hampshire
Populated places established in 1761
Towns in New Hampshire